Shari Lynn Belafonte (born September 22, 1954) is an American actress, model, writer and singer. The daughter of singer Harry Belafonte, she began her career as a fashion model before making her big screen debut appearing in the 1982 drama film If You Could See What I Hear. She is best known for her role as Julie Gillette in the ABC drama series Hotel from 1983 to 1988. She later went to star in the Canadian science fiction series Beyond Reality (1991–93). Belafonte also released two studio albums in the 1980s, and acted on stage in later years.

Early life
Shari Belafonte is the second daughter of Marguerite (née Byrd), a psychologist, and New York-born Harry Belafonte, a singer and actor. Her parents separated when her mother was pregnant with her. She attended Georgetown Day School in Washington, DC, Windsor Mountain School in Lenox, Massachusetts and Buxton School in Williamstown, Massachusetts, then Hampshire College in Amherst, Massachusetts before transferring to Carnegie-Mellon University in Pittsburgh where she earned her Bachelor of Fine Arts degree in drama. Her paternal grandmother was born in Jamaica, the child of a Scottish Jamaican mother and an Afro-Jamaican father. Her paternal grandfather also was born in Jamaica, the child of a black mother and Dutch-Jewish father of Sephardic Jewish descent. Harry, Jr. was raised Catholic.

Career

1980s
Belafonte began her career as a model, becoming a successful cover girl model and appearing in commercials for Calvin Klein jeans. She made her feature film debut in 1982 in the movies Time Walker and If You Could See What I Hear. She then worked as a production assistant and assistant director in public television on the East Coast before moving to Los Angeles, where she became an assistant to the publicist at Hanna-Barbera productions. While getting her hands wet "behind the scenes", she also received a number of modeling and commercial assignments, and was known to have appeared on the covers of over 300 magazines as of 2015. Other feature films include Speed Zone, the made-for-television horror-comedy film The Midnight Hour, in which she also sang a song titled "Get Dead", and Fire, Ice and Dynamite.

The television producer Aaron Spelling chose Belafonte as a finalist for Julie Rogers on Charlie's Angels, a role written with her specifically in mind, but the part instead went to Tanya Roberts. In 1981 she was cast as a fashion model in a 2nd-season episode of Hart to Hart.

In 1984, Spelling did choose her for another pilot, this one for the action-adventure series Velvet alongside Leah Ayres, Mary Margaret Humes, and Sheree J. Wilson. In the same year, Spelling signed Belafonte as Julie Gilette in the ABC drama series Hotel, in which she starred during the show's five-year run, which extended from 1983 to 1988. It was during this time that, Belafonte began her music career by signing a contract to record on the Metronome Records label, releasing two studio albums; these were The Eyes of Night in 1987 and Shari in 1989.

1990s—present
In 1990, Belafonte made her theatrical debut in Tamara, playing the title role in the long-running Los Angeles production. Shortly thereafter, she starred as Dr. Laura Wingate in the USA Network's drama series Beyond Reality, which ran for two seasons from 1991 to 1993. She co-starred in a number of made-for-television movies in 1990s, including French Silk (1994) starring Susan Lucci, The Heidi Chronicles (1995) starring Jamie Lee Curtis, Babylon 5: Thirdspace (1998) and Loving Evangeline (1999). In addition, she co-hosted the syndicated series Lifestyles with Robin Leach and Shari Belafonte (1994–95), an updated version of Leach's signature program, Lifestyles of the Rich and Famous. In 2006, she hosted a travel program called "Travels In Mexico And The Caribbean With Shari Belafonte" on NYC Media.

Belafonte's multi-faceted career also includes moderating and voiceovers. Belafonte provided the voice of Gerald's mother, Mrs. Johanssen, in four episodes of Hey Arnold!, Diana Cruz in an episode of The Real Adventures of Jonny Quest, and the undead Southern belle zombie Blanche in Gravedale High. She has producing credits for theater, public and network television, and feature films. In addition to her affiliation with numerous children's, animal, and environment causes, she has also become the international spokesman for the Starlight Children's Foundation. Named by the Wall Street Journal as one of the top ten celebrity endorsers, Shari has been the spokesman for numerous corporations including Bally's International Health and Fitness, Slim-Fast, Diet System 6, and Estroven.

In 2000s, Belafonte made a number of limited screen appearances, guest starring in an episode of The District and Nip/Tuck. In December 2015, it was announced that Belafonte would take over the role of Mayor Janice Lomax from Saidah Arrika Ekulona on January 19, 2016, on the ABC daytime soap opera General Hospital. She made her last appearance on December 20, 2017. In 2019, she began appearing in a recurring role as Julia in the Apple TV+ drama series The Morning Show. Later that year, she took the recurring role as Ebony Obsidian's character's mother in the BET comedy-drama series, Sistas.

Personal life
Belafonte has been married twice, first to Robert Harper (May 21, 1977 – 1988). She has been married to Sam Behrens since December 31, 1989. Belafonte posed nude for Playboy in the magazine's September 2000 edition, and was herself an avid photographer.

Filmography

Film

Television

Discography

Eyes Of Night (1987)
Shari (1989)

References

External links
 
 

Actresses from New York City
American film actresses
American people of Dutch-Jewish descent
American people of Martiniquais descent
American people of Scottish descent
American musicians of Jamaican descent
American soap opera actresses
American television actresses
American voice actresses
Carnegie Mellon University College of Fine Arts alumni
20th-century American actresses
21st-century American actresses
Living people
Buxton School (Massachusetts) alumni
1954 births